Flying High is an American comedy-drama television series, created by Dawn Aldredge and Martin Cohan, starring Kathryn Witt, Connie Sellecca, Pat Klous, and Howard Platt. The series aired on CBS from August 28, 1978, to January 23, 1979.

Premise
The plot follows three attractive flight attendants (Marcy Bower, Pam Bellagio and Lisa Benton) working for the fictional Sun West Airlines in Los Angeles.

Cast
 Kathryn Witt as Pam Bellagio
 Connie Sellecca as Lisa Benton
 Pat Klous as Marcy Bower
 Howard Platt as Captain Doug March
 Ken Olfson as Raymond Strickman

Platt (then age 40) and Sellecca (age 23) met on-set and developed a romantic relationship which led to a brief engagement.

Actress Tanya Roberts was at one point intended to be involved, but was dropped.

Episode list

Production
In early May 1978, CBS announced its new schedule plan for the 1978–79 season, with eight new shows including Flying High planned for 10-11pm Friday time slot. The three protagonists, played by Kathryn Witt, Connie Sellecca and Pat Klous, were recruited from top New York modeling agencies with a specific plan to find three very attractive female models with or without acting experience. As executive producer Mark Carliner recounted at the time, when he went to visit the CBS head of program planning Harvey Shephard to pitch the show with three models in tow, the network's sales head saw them on the elevator and after learning they were pitching a show, immediately called the head of programming to say "we need this show".  

The program was not exactly a unique concept -- Flying High was one of a number of programs developed in the late 1970s and early 1980s in what has been called the "jiggle" era. In fact, NBC had its own show featuring stewardesses, "Coastocoast", an hour-long sitcom that the network announced as part of its 1978-79 lineup; however, it was cancelled before airing.

Broadcast
A two-hour television film pilot aired on August 28, 1978, during the summer re-run season, and was the most-watched prime-time show of the week. The first regular hour-long episode aired on September 29, 1978 (the show was pre-empted a week prior by a special two-hour wedding episode of The Incredible Hulk). By mid-October, it was already clear that the show was in trouble due to low ratings; it ranked only 56th out of 65 shows for the week ending October 15, 1978, and did not improve, finally being yanked from the CBS schedule in January 1979.

Critical reception
The series also received negative reviews, along with American Girls, for its representation of women as "curiously old-fashioned, if not stereotypical." Both series were seen as trying to copycat the success of Charlie's Angels, but neither succeeded.

References

External links
 
 Flying High at TV Guide
 

1978 American television series debuts
1979 American television series endings
1970s American comedy-drama television series
CBS original programming
English-language television shows
Television shows set in Los Angeles
Aviation television series
Television series about flight attendants